Elena Lucchinelli (born 24 October 2001) is an Italian professional racing cyclist, who most recently rode for UCI Women's Continental Team .

References

External links
 

2001 births
Living people
Italian female cyclists
People from La Spezia
Cyclists from Liguria
Sportspeople from the Province of La Spezia